Adam Gordon T. B. Plunkett (16 March 1903 – 1992) was a Scottish professional footballer who played in the Football League for Walsall, Coventry City, Rochdale and Queens Park Rangers as a left back.

Career statistics

References 

English Football League players
Association football fullbacks
Walsall F.C. players
Scottish footballers
1903 births
1992 deaths
People from Blantyre, South Lanarkshire
Blantyre Celtic F.C. players
Queens Park Rangers F.C. players
Guildford City F.C. players
Southern Football League players
Coventry City F.C. players
Oswestry Town F.C. players
Hinckley Athletic F.C. players
Loughborough Corinthians F.C. players
Rochdale A.F.C. players
Stalybridge Celtic F.C. players
Midland Football League players